John H (Jack) Schuenemeyer is President of Southwest Statistical Consulting, Cortez, Colorado. He is also Professor Emeritus of Statistics, Geology, and Geography, University of Delaware. Schuenemeyer was elected as a Fellow of the American Statistical Association in 1991. International Association for Mathematical Geosciences has awarded him the IAMG Distinguished Lectureship in 2012. In 2004, he was awarded John Cedric Griffiths Teaching Award by the International Association for Mathematical Geosciences.

Education
BS in applied mathematics, University of Colorado
MS in applied mathematics, University of Colorado
PhD in statistics, University of Georgia

Selected Book
John Schuenemeyer and Larry Drew, Statistics for Earth and Environmental Scientists, Wiley, 2011, p. 420.
Richard F. Link and John H. Schuenemeyer, Computer programs for geology, Artronic Information Systems, 1972, p. 142.

References

Living people
University of Colorado alumni
University of Georgia alumni
University of Delaware faculty
Fellows of the American Statistical Association
Place of birth missing (living people)
Year of birth missing (living people)